Pimelea aquilonia is a species of flowering plant in the family Thymelaeaceae and is endemic to far north Queensland. It is a shrub with narrowly elliptic leaves and small clusters of hairy, white or cream-coloured, tube-shaped flowers.

Description
The flowers are borne in small clusters on the ends of branches, and are white or cream-coloured, densely covered with short, shiny hairs. Flowering occurs from May to July.

Taxonomy
Pimelea aquilonia  was first formally described in 2017 by Barbara Lynette Rye in the Flora of Australia from specimens collected by Leonard John Brass on Cape York Peninsula in 1948.

Distribution and habitat
This pimelea mainly grows in windswept, near-coastal shrubland, from the tip of Cape York Peninsula to  further south, and possibly as far south as Mount Pieter Botte.

References

aquilonia
Flora of Queensland
Malvales of Australia
Plants described in 1990